The men's doubles tournament at the 1990 French Open was held from 28 May until 10 June 1990 on the outdoor clay courts at the Stade Roland Garros in Paris, France. Sergio Casal and Emilio Sánchez won the title, defeating Goran Ivanišević and Petr Korda in the final.

Seeds

Draw

Finals

Top half

Section 1

Section 2

Bottom half

Section 3

Section 4

External links
 Association of Tennis Professionals (ATP) – main draw
1990 French Open – Men's draws and results at the International Tennis Federation
 

Men's Doubles
French Open by year – Men's doubles